Freak was a one-man show, written by David Bar Katz and John Leguizamo. The play debuted at Cort Theater on Broadway in 1998 and won the Drama Desk Award for Outstanding One-Person Show.

There is no linear plot to the play, but over the course of the performance, Leguizamo traces his life from the very beginning (as a sperm cell) to the beginning of his career in show business. During the course of the play, Leguizamo portrays dozens of different characters, including friends, relatives and neighbors that he knew while growing up in Queens, New York. Leguizamo plays characters of both genders and of many different ethnicities, sometimes engaging in multi-character dialogues all by himself.

The show garnered Leguizamo and members of the production crew with several awards and nominations.

A filmed performance was directed by Spike Lee aired on HBO under the same name. Leguizamo followed this performance up with the Broadway show Sexaholix... A Love Story in 2001 which also aired on HBO.

External links

1998 plays
Plays for one performer
Broadway plays
American plays adapted into films
Plays set in New York City